Raimundo Bibiani "Mumo" Orsi (2 December 1901 – 6 April 1986) was an Italian Argentine footballer who played as a winger or as a forward. At the international level he represented both Argentina and Italy, winning the 1927 Copa América and the silver medal at the 1928 Summer Olympics in Amsterdam, Netherlands, with Argentina, as well as two editions of the Central European International Cup and the 1934 FIFA World Cup, with Italy.

Club career
His career began in Argentina with Club Atlético Independiente (1920–1928; 1935), but it was with Juventus that Orsi would have the most success in his club career. He joined the club in time for the 1928–29 season and would stay at Juventus until 1935, winning five consecutive league titles between 1931 and 1935. After leaving Italy, Orsi played the rest of his career in South America. He returned to Independiente before moving on to Boca Juniors (1936), Club Atlético Platense (1937–38), and Almagro (1939–40); he also played for Flamengo in Brazil (1939; 1940), Peñarol in Uruguay (1941–42), and Santiago National in Chile (1943).

International career
His international debut for Argentina on August 10, 1924 was against Uruguay. Over the next 12 years, he played 13 times for Argentina and scored 3 goals, winning the 1927 Copa América and the silver medal at the 1928 Summer Olympics in Amsterdam, Netherlands. Orsi's career is strange by modern standards, however, in that he played for Italy as well as Argentina, allowing him to gain 35 caps and score 13 goals for his second country between December 1, 1929 and March 24, 1935. This also allowed him to win two editions of the Central European International Cup, and to be a part of the side that won the 1934 FIFA World Cup, in the final of which he scored. He died in 1986 aged 84.

Style of play
Considered one of the greatest players of his time, and one of the best ever Italian players in his position, Orsi was a quick left-footed winger, who usually played on the left flank, due to his crossing ability. A prolific goalscorer, he was an accurate finisher, both with his head and his feet, and he excelled in the air and acrobatically; because of this he was also capable of playing as a striker, and on the right flank, a position in which he was able to make diagonal attacking runs or cut into the centre to shoot with his stronger foot. Nicknamed "Mumo", despite his lack of shooting power and physical strength, he was an extremely quick player, with excellent technical ability, who was renowned for his dribbling skills and his use of feints to beat opponents. He was also an accurate penalty kick taker.

Honours

Club
Independiente
Asociación Amateurs de Football: 1922, 1924, 1925

Juventus
Serie A: 1930–31, 1931–32, 1932–33, 1933–34, 1934–35

Flamengo
Rio State Championship: 1939

International
Argentina
 South American Football Championship: 1927
 Summer Olympics: Runner-up 1928

Italy
 World Cup: 1934
 Central European International Cup: 1927–30, 1933–35
 Central European International Cup: Runner-up: 1931-32

Individual
FIFA World Cup Team of the Tournament: 1934

References

External links

Biography 
 
History with Juventus 
Stats with Flamengo 
arfsh.com article: Raimundo Orsi 

1901 births
1986 deaths
Sportspeople from Avellaneda
Argentine people of Italian descent
Argentine footballers
Argentine expatriate footballers
Argentina international footballers
Italian footballers
Italian expatriate footballers
Italy international footballers
Olympic footballers of Argentina
Olympic silver medalists for Argentina
Footballers at the 1928 Summer Olympics
Boca Juniors footballers
Peñarol players
Santiago National F.C. players
CR Flamengo footballers
Club Atlético Independiente footballers
Juventus F.C. players
Club Atlético Platense footballers
Club Almagro players
Chilean Primera División players
Argentine Primera División players
Serie A players
1934 FIFA World Cup players
FIFA World Cup-winning players
Expatriate footballers in Argentina
Expatriate footballers in Brazil
Expatriate footballers in Chile
Expatriate footballers in Italy
Expatriate footballers in Uruguay
Expatriate football managers in Chile
Argentine expatriate sportspeople in Chile
Italian expatriate sportspeople in Chile
Argentine expatriate sportspeople in Uruguay
Italian expatriate sportspeople in Uruguay
Dual internationalists (football)
Olympic medalists in football
Medalists at the 1928 Summer Olympics
Association football wingers
Argentine football managers